Hoplia festiva is a species of scarab beetle in the family Scarabaeidae. It is found in Central America.

References 

Melolonthinae
Beetles described in 1844